The 2020 Victorian Football League season, which was to have been the 139th season of the Victorian Football Association/Victorian Football League Australian rules football competition, was cancelled due to the COVID-19 pandemic.

Impact of the COVID-19 pandemic

Preparations for the 2020 season featured all fifteen clubs from 2019, but the season was disrupted by the COVID-19 pandemic, which was formally declared a pandemic on 11 March 2020, three weeks prior to the scheduled start of the premiership season. Governmental restrictions on non-essential public gatherings during the pandemic meant that, as a minimum, matches would need to be played before empty stadiums, as was planned for the Australian Football League; however, AFL clubs with VFL reserves teams or affiliates had separate concerns that their players could be exposed to the virus when playing in the VFL, since the state league would not be able to offer the same level of medical and quarantine protections that the fully professional league could. AFL clubs began to withdraw their AFL-listed players from their VFL preseason programs, before the start of the VFL season was suspended indefinitely on 16 March. The AFL season was suspended shortly afterwards, and state government lockdowns precluded any state football being played.

Soon after,  ended its reserves affiliation with the Northern Blues. Carlton had been investing significant money in the VFL club and in developing it as a pathway to senior football, but the financial impact of the pandemic forced Carlton to make significant cuts to its expenses, and ending its affiliation was one of these cuts. The Northern Blues club was by this stage reliant on Carlton for its financial viability; as a result, the club temporarily dropped out of the league after 101 years of membership. Carlton adopted a lower-cost strategy by fielding a stand-alone reserves team when AFL players were next released to play in the VFL in 2021. The Northern Blues initially announced that they would fold, but regrouped throughout the year and found a model under which it would be viable as a stand-alone club; as a result, the club returned to the league under its previous Northern Bullants name from 2021.

After months of uncertainty, and as lockdowns were being lifted, it was agreed on 16 June to play a shortened VFL season, with training to start from 13 July and the season to begin on 1 August. Significantly, however, all AFL clubs were required to continue to keep AFL-listed players away from the state league systems for the entire season, in order to better control their quarantine environments and avoid risk to the AFL season; this means that AFL reserves teams were unable to contest the restarted season, and the three remaining clubs with reserves affiliations – Box Hill, Casey and Sandringham – would need to temporarily play as standalone senior clubs for the first time in two decades, and were allowed to top up their playing lists, including getting first selection of any VFL-listed players from the AFL clubs' reserves teams who were seeking new teams for the season.

This, coupled with the Northern Blues expecting to fold and being in no position to field a team, initially left only eight clubs to contest the shortened season. However, two weeks later, on 3 July, Casey announced its withdrawal from the season as well. Although the club had been preparing for the season and signing players to bolster its list, it opted to withdraw citing concern about health risks amid an ongoing rise in Victorian cases at the time. The club was also dealing with the fact that it was not able to use Casey Fields, as it was normally shared with the AFL's Melbourne Football Club as a training venue, and quarantine segregations were required between VFL and AFL systems.

Preparations continued, but on 7 July, the same date that the new fixture was released to clubs, the second wave of virus cases across Melbourne resulted in a new lockdown being imposed by the government which all but precluded organised sport in the state until at least 19 August (and ultimately lasting several months beyond that). The following day, the decision was made to cancel the season outright. It was the first senior VFA/VFL season to be cancelled since 1944, when the VFA was suffering from a financial crisis that was exacerbated by Australia's participation in World War II.

Notable events
Coburg's normal home venue, Piranha Park, was under a planned redevelopment during the year. Under the original fixture prior to the suspension, most of the club's home games were scheduled at Highgate Reserve, Craigieburn, with once-off home games were scheduled for: Preston City Oval, Avalon Airport Oval, Mars Stadium and MacPherson Park (Melton).

See also 
 List of VFA/VFL premiers
 Australian rules football
 Victorian Football League
 Australian Football League
 2020 AFL season

References

External links
 Season results

Victorian Football League seasons
VFL
Victorian Football League season 2020